The 3000 and 5000 meters distances for women in the 2014–15 ISU Speed Skating World Cup were contested over six races on six occasions, out of a total of seven World Cup occasions for the season, with the first occasion taking place in Obihiro, Japan, on 14–16 November 2014, and the final occasion taking place in Erfurt, Germany, on 21–22 March 2015.

Martina Sáblíková of the Czech Republic won her ninth straight cup.

Top three

Race medallists

Standings 
Standings as of 22 March 2015.

References 

 
Women 3000